

South Africa is the only country in Africa with a commercial nuclear power plant.

Two reactors located at the Koeberg nuclear power station accounts for around 5% of South Africa's electricity production. Spent fuel is disposed of at Vaalputs Radioactive Waste Disposal Facility in the Northern Cape.

The SAFARI-1 tank in pool research reactor is located at the Pelindaba nuclear research centre in Gauteng.

New build

Plans for new nuclear power have been scaled back, and new build is now considered unlikely before 2030.

The 2010 Integrated Resource Plan (IRP) envisaged building 9,600 MWe of new nuclear power capacity by building between six and eight new nuclear reactors by 2030, which would cost about R1 trillion. 

In 2016, an updated draft IRP was published which set a much lower and slower nuclear target, due to lower demand projections and increased capital cost. This updated IRP envisaged that the first new nuclear power plant would only need to be online by 2041.

South Africa's 2019 Integrated Resource Plan (IRP) plans a 20 year life-extension for Koeberg to 2044, and a delayed nuclear new build programme due to the "marginal cost of [nuclear] generation, in comparison to other options" with a scenario that may build new capacity after 2030.

Criticism 
There was much concern about the cost of the endeavour, as well as the probability for corruption, due to the lack of transparency in the procurement processes and the disregard of civic society. President at the time Jacob Zuma nevertheless pushed ahead with plans to secure nuclear power.

Legality 
Following the Public Protector's "State of Capture" report, which implicated him and Jacob Zuma in the peddling of state patronage, Brian Molefe resigned from his position as executive chief of Eskom on 1 January 2017. However, analysts noted that corruption at Eskom was deep-rooted and that Molefe's resignation would not resolve the nuclear question. In April 2017, Eskom requested that the Treasury department waive procurement regulations for the new nuclear plants, claiming that Eskom "had done a lot of the work prior" and that these efforts were adequate. The Democratic Alliance objected on the grounds that this would embark the state on its "single biggest public procurement without fully assessing associated risks and consequences for SA’s economy".

On 26 April 2017, following a legal application by Earthlife Africa and the Southern African Faith Communities Environment Institute, the Western Cape High Court declared that the South African government's new nuclear procurement processes had been unlawful because they had not followed due processes.  The court noted that the National Energy Regulator, Parliament, and the Energy Minister must all be involved in the process. All of the subsequent existing contracts with Russia, the US, and South Korea were therefore found to be void.

Costs 
The R1 trillion cost of the proposed new nuclear project played a part in ratings downgrades by international credit ratings agencies.

Finance Minister Pravin Gordhan, who opposed new nuclear installations on the grounds of the steep cost, was replaced by Malusi Gigaba in March, 2017. Gigaba is responsible for filling the vacancy of chief procurement officer at Treasury, which would make decisions about procurement processes regarding the new nuclear project.

Life extension of Koeberg 
In January 2018, Eskom's acting Chief Financial Officer stated that the company cannot afford a new nuclear build, following a 34% drop in interim profits due to declining sales and increasing financing costs. The government stated it will proceed with the plan but more slowly. The draft 2018 IRP does not call for new nuclear power, partly due to declining electricity demand, forecast 30% lower than in the previous IRP.

South Africa's 2019 Integrated Resource Plan (IRP) plans a 20 year life-extension for Koeberg to 2044, and a delayed nuclear new build programme due to the "marginal cost of [nuclear] generation, in comparison to other options" with a scenario that may build new capacity after 2030. Small modular reactors may become an attractive option, dependent on earlier demonstration elsewhere in the world.

Nuclear expertise in South Africa 
AREVA built the twin units of the Koeberg nuclear power plant. In 2001, AREVA NP ( renamed Framatome in 2018 ) bought a 45% stake in LESEDI Nuclear Services, followed by a further 6% stake in 2006. Today Framatome is a majority shareholder in Lesedi Nuclear Services.

In 2016, the IAEA Concluded a Long Term Operational Safety Review at South Africa’s Koeberg Nuclear Power Plant. The Pre-SALTO (Safety Aspects of Long Term Operation) review mission was requested by the Government of South Africa’s Department of Energy. "A SALTO peer review is a comprehensive safety review addressing strategy and key elements for the safe Long Term Operation of nuclear power plants".

Other Nuclear Energy news and more reading:

 The IAEA
The South African Young Nuclear Professionals Society
https://www.world-nuclear.org/information-library/country-profiles/countries-o-s/south-africa.aspx

See also
 South African nuclear program
 South African Nuclear Energy Corporation
 Nuclear power stations in South Africa
 List of nuclear reactors in South Africa

References